Events from the year 1845 in Denmark.

Incumbents
 Monarch – Christian VIII
 Prime minister – Poul Christian Stemann

Events
 15 June – Klampenborg Vandkuur-, Brønd- og Søbadeanstalt, the first spa resort in Denmark, opens.

Undated
 Henrik Hertz writes the verse drama Kong Renés Datter

Culture

Music

 22 August  Hans Christian Lumbye's Champagne Galop premières in Tivoli Gardens to mark the second aniversary of the amusement parl.

Births
 20 May – Johan Henrik Deuntzer, prime minister (died 1918)
 24 December – King George I of Greece (died 1913 in Greece)

Deaths
 24 February - Prince Frederik of Hesse, nobleman, general and governor (born 1771)
 10 July - Christian Frederik Hansen, architect (born 1756)
 21 June – Gottfried Becker (born 1767), pharmacist and industrialist (born 1767)
 4 August - Jacob Holm, industrialist, ship owner and ship builder (born 1779)
 Johanna Elisabeth Dahlén, stage actress and opera singer

References

 
1840s in Denmark
Denmark
Years of the 19th century in Denmark